Arthur Joseph Pound (19 March 1930 – 17 August 2022) was an Australian rules footballer who played for the Melbourne Football Club in the Victorian Football League (VFL).

Notes

External links 

Arthur Pound's playing statistics from The VFA Project

1930 births
2022 deaths
Australian rules footballers from Victoria (Australia)
Melbourne Football Club players
Brighton Football Club players
Place of birth missing